The 1999 Bryant Bulldogs football team represented Bryant College as a member the Central Division of the Eastern Football Conference (EFC) during the 1999 NCAA Division II football season. The Bulldogs were led by first-year head coach Jim Miceli and played their home games at Bulldog Stadium. Bryant compiled an overall record of 5–4 with a mark of 4–4 in conference play, placing third in the EFC's Central Division.

Schedule

References

Bryant
Bryant Bulldogs football seasons
Bryant Bulldogs football